Prunus scoparia is a wild almond found in Turkey, Iran, Turkmenistan and Afghanistan. It is a xerophytic shrub and it has been used as a grafting stock for domesticated almonds to provide drought resistance.

References

scoparia
Plants described in 1905
Flora of Turkmenistan
Flora of Iran